The Estadio Olímpico Andrés Quintana Roo is a 18,844 seat stadium in Cancún, Quintana Roo, Mexico. It is the home field of Expansión MX’s Cancún F.C., and was formerly the home field of Ascenso MX's Atlante F.C. The stadium was inaugurated on August 11, 2007, in a game against Universidad Nacional. Atlante F.C. won in this stadium their 3rd league title in Apertura 2007 against Universidad Nacional. The Houston Dynamo became the first Major League Soccer team to play in the stadium on March 3, 2009, when the club were defeated by Atlante in the second leg of the CONCACAF Champions League quarterfinals.

The stadium was set to host the Tiburones de Cancún of the Fútbol Americano de México league for their 2022 season, though the team only played their home opener at the stadium before they were forced to find another venue.

References

Atlante F.C.
Quintana Roo
Sports venues in Quintana Roo
Athletics (track and field) venues in Mexico
Cancún
2007 establishments in Mexico
Sports venues completed in 2007